Douglas Murray was a Canadian politician, who was leader of the Prince Edward Island New Democratic Party from 1981 to 1982. A longtime organizer with the party, he assumed the leadership in 1981; however, within a year he resigned the position due to difficulties in fulfilling the role due to a congenital heart condition.

References

Possibly living people
New Democratic Party of Prince Edward Island leaders